A dislocated shoulder is a condition in which the head of the humerus is detached from the shoulder joint. Symptoms include shoulder pain and instability. Complications may include a Bankart lesion, Hill-Sachs lesion, rotator cuff tear, or injury to the axillary nerve.

A shoulder dislocation often occurs as a result of a fall onto an outstretched arm or onto the shoulder. Diagnosis is typically based on symptoms and confirmed by X-rays. They are classified as anterior, posterior, inferior, and superior with most being anterior.

Treatment is by shoulder reduction which may be accomplished by a number of techniques. These include traction-countertraction, external rotation, scapular manipulation, and the Stimson technique. After reduction X-rays are recommended for verification. The arm may then be placed in a sling for a few weeks. Surgery may be recommended in those with recurrent dislocations.

Not all patients require surgery following a shoulder dislocation.  There is moderate quality evidence that patients who receive physical therapy after an acute shoulder dislocation will not experience recurrent dislocations. It has been shown that patients who do not receive surgery after a shoulder dislocation do not experience recurrent dislocations within two years of the initial injury.

About 1.7% of people have a shoulder dislocation within their lifetime. In the United States this is about 24 per 100,000 people per year. They make up about half of major joint dislocations seen in emergency departments. Males are affected more often than females. Most shoulder dislocations occur as a result of sports injuries.

Signs and symptoms
 Significant pain, sometimes felt along the arm past the shoulder.
 Sensation that the shoulder is slipping out of the joint during abduction and external rotation.
 Shoulder and arm held in external rotation (anterior dislocation), or adduction and internal rotation (posterior dislocation). Resistance of all movement.
 Numbness of the arm.
 Visibly displaced shoulder.  Some dislocations result in the shoulder appearing unusually square.
 No palpable bone on the side of the shoulder.

Diagnosis

A diagnosis of shoulder dislocation is often suspected based on the person's history and physical examination. Radiographs are made to confirm the diagnosis. Most dislocations are apparent on radiographs showing incongruence of the glenohumeral joint. Posterior dislocations may be hard to detect on standard AP radiographs, but are more readily detected on other views. After reduction, radiographs are usually repeated to confirm successful reduction and to detect bone damage. After repeated shoulder dislocations, an MRI scan may be used to assess soft tissue damage. In regards to recurrent dislocations, the apprehension test (anterior instability) and sulcus sign (inferior instability) are useful methods for determining predisposition to future dislocation.

There are three main types of dislocations: anterior, posterior, and inferior.

Anterior (forward)

In over 95% of shoulder dislocations, the humerus is displaced anteriorly.  In most of those, the head of the humerus comes to rest under the coracoid process, referred to as sub-coracoid dislocation.  Sub-glenoid, subclavicular, and, very rarely, intrathoracic or retroperitoneal dislocations may also occur.

Anterior dislocations are usually caused by a direct blow to, or fall on, an outstretched arm. The person typically holds his/her arm externally rotated and slightly abducted.

A Hill–Sachs lesion is an impaction of the head of the humerus left by the glenoid rim during dislocation. Hill-Sachs deformities occur in 35–40% of anterior dislocations. They can be seen on a front-facing X-ray when the arm is in internal rotation. Bankart lesions are disruptions of the glenoid labrum with or without an avulsion of bone fragment.

Damage to the axillary artery and axillary nerve (C5, C6) may result. The axillary nerve is injured in 37% making it the most commonly injured structure with this type of injury. Other common, associated, nerve injuries include injury to the suprascapular nerve (29%) and the radial nerve (22%).  Axillary nerve damage results in a weakened or paralyzed deltoid muscle and as the deltoid atrophies unilaterally, the normal rounded contour of the shoulder is lost. A person with injury to the axillary nerve will have difficulty in abducting the arm from approximately 15° away from the body. The supraspinatus muscle initiates abduction from a fully adducted position.

Posterior (backward)

Posterior dislocations are uncommon, and are typically due to the muscle contraction from electric shock or seizure. They may be caused by strength imbalance of the rotator cuff muscles. People with dislocated shoulders typically present holding their arm internally rotated and adducted, and exhibiting flattening of the anterior shoulder with a prominent coracoid process.

Posterior dislocations may go unrecognized, especially in an elderly person and in people who are in the state of unconscious trauma. An average interval of 1 year was noted between injury and diagnosis in a series of 40 people.

Inferior (downward)

Inferior dislocation is the least likely, occurring in less than 1%.  This condition is also called luxatio erecta because the arm appears to be permanently held upward or behind the head.  It is caused by a hyper abduction of the arm that forces the humeral head against the acromion.  Such injuries have a high complication rate as many vascular, neurological, tendon, and ligament injuries are likely to occur from this mechanism of injury.

Treatment
Prompt medical treatment should be sought for suspected dislocation.
Usually, the shoulder is kept in its current position by use of a splint or sling.  A pillow between the arm and torso may provide support and increase comfort. Strong analgesics are needed to allay the pain of a dislocation and the distress associated with it.

Reduction

Shoulder reduction may be accomplished with a number of techniques including traction-countertraction, external rotation, scapular manipulation, Stimson technique, Cunningham technique, or Milch technique. Pain can be managed during the procedures either by procedural sedation and analgesia or injected lidocaine into the shoulder joint. Injecting lidocaine into the joint may be less expensive and faster. If a shoulder cannot be relocated in the emergency room, relocation in the operating room may be required. This situation occurs in about 7% of cases.

 Stimson procedure is the least painful, widely used shoulder reduction technique. In this procedure a weight is attached to the wrist while the injured arm is hanging off an examination table for between 20 and 30 minutes. The arm is then slowly rotated until the shoulder is relocated. Sedatives are used in Stimson procedure and first time Stimson reduction for acute shoulder dislocation requires wearing arm slings for between 2 and 4 weeks.

Post-reduction
There is no strong evidence of a difference in outcomes when the arm is immobilized in internal versus external rotation following an anterior shoulder dislocation. A 2008 study of 300 people for almost six years found that conventional shoulder immobilisation in a sling offered no benefit.

Surgery

In young adults engaged in highly demanding activities shoulder surgery may be considered. Arthroscopic surgery techniques may be used to repair the glenoidal labrum, capsular ligaments, biceps long head anchor or SLAP lesion or to tighten the shoulder capsule.

Arthroscopic stabilization surgery has evolved from the Bankart repair, a time-honored surgical treatment for recurrent anterior instability of the shoulder. However, the failure rate following Bankart repair has been shown to increase markedly in people with significant bone loss from the glenoid (socket).  In such cases, improved results have been reported with some form of bone augmentation of the glenoid such as the Latarjet operation.

Although posterior dislocation is much less common, instability following it is no less challenging and, again, some form of bone augmentation may be required to control instability. Damaged ligaments, including labral tears, occurring as a result of posterior dislocations may be treated arthroscopically.

There remains those situations characterized by multidirectional instability, which have failed to respond satisfactorily to rehabilitation, falling under the AMBRI classification previously noted. This is usually due to an overstretched and redundant capsule which no longer offers stability or support.  Traditionally, this has responded well to a 'reefing' procedure known as an open inferior capsular shift. More recently, the procedure has been carried out as an arthroscopic procedure, rather than open surgery, again with comparable results. Most recently, the procedure has been carried out using radio frequency technology to shrink the redundant shoulder capsule (thermal capsular shrinkage); while long-term results of this development are currently unproven, recent studies show thermal capsular shrinkage have higher failure rates with the highest number of cases of instability recurrence and re-operation.

Prognosis
After an anterior shoulder dislocation, the risk of a future dislocation is about 20%. This risk is greater in males than females.

See also 
 Shoulder problems

References

External links 

Injuries of shoulder and upper arm
Shoulder
Dislocations, sprains and strains
Wikipedia medicine articles ready to translate